Milutin Garašanin (22 February 1843 – 5 March 1898) was a Serbian politician who held the post of Prime Minister of Serbia, President of the National Assembly, Minister of Finance, Internal affairs, Ambassador to France and Ambassador to Austria.

He was born to influential politician Ilija Garašanin and went on to finish a prestigious French military school in Metz. Garašanin returned to Serbia and started a business in flour production located on the family estate in Grocka. When Serbian-Turkish Wars (1876–1878) started, Milutin Garašanin took part in the war serving as artillery captain. He was promoted colonel after the war and went to pursue a successful political career, founding the Serbian progressive party and holding a number of important posts. Serbian Academy of Sciences and Arts elected Garašanin a full member. Garašanin was considered to be one of the best orators of the Kingdom of Serbia. He was awarded the Order of Prince Danilo I.

Selected works
Dokolice
Dva namesništva

References

1843 births
1898 deaths
Finance ministers of Serbia
Government ministers of Serbia
19th-century Serbian people
Foreign ministers of Serbia
Interior ministers of Serbia